Stirling Aerodrome  is a registered aerodrome located  south southwest of Stirling, Ontario, Canada, north of Belleville.

It has a single , hybrid runway: the eastern  section is paved with asphalt, while the western  section is turf.

The aerodrome is operated by the Oak Hills Flying Club.

References

External links
 Stirling Aerodrome

Registered aerodromes in Ontario
Buildings and structures in Hastings County